Rome Airport may refer to:

In Rome, Italy:
In service:
 Ciampino–G. B. Pastine International Airport in Ciampino, Italy, near Rome (IATA/ICAO: CIA/LIRA)
 Leonardo da Vinci–Fiumicino Airport, international airport in Fiumicino, Italy, near Rome (IATA/ICAO: FCO/LIRF)
 Rome Urbe Airport in Rome, Italy (ICAO: LIRU)
Out of service:
 Centocelle Airport, in Centocelle, Rome, Italy (IATA/ICAO: none/LIRC)
 Rome Viterbo Airport, in Viterbo, Italy

In the United States:
 Rome State Airport in Rome, Oregon, United States (FAA/IATA: REO)
 Becks Grove Airport in Rome, New York, United States (FAA: K16)
 Griffiss International Airport in Rome, New York, United States (FAA/IATA: RME)
 Richard B. Russell Airport in Rome, Georgia, United States (FAA/IATA: RMG)